is an anime television series created by Masashi Ikeda and Sunrise, set around the students that attend a prestigious school.

Plot
Agate Fluorite is the new transfer student at the elite school, "Cluster E.A.", in which the sons of many prestigious families from different countries gather to study together. Soon after, Agate's unexpected antics and enthusiasm in life impress many of his schoolmates, including Beryl Jasper, an honor student who hates his family, but when it is discovered that Agate was involved in a fight, helping a known artificial soldier sympathizer Agate finds himself on the run and eventually without all of his memories intact. Unknown to Agate, he was born with a secret power that can create miracles. With his ability to create miracles not only is the military but the religious sect is after him.

Characters

Main characters

Agate is the main protagonist and actually a God of Judgment.

Beryl is an honor student who hates his family.

Fon is a young boy who befriends Agate.

Chrome is leader of the artificial soldiers who shared memories with Chalce.

Other characters

Episodes

Theme songs
Opening Theme:
(Episodes 1-14): "FLY HIGH" by surface
(Episodes 15-24): "Bokutachi no kiseki" by Cluster'S
 (Episode 25): No opening

Ending Theme:
(Episodes 1-14): "Kimi to iu na no hikari" by Cluster'S
(Episodes 15-24): "Kokoro no tsubomi" by surface
 (Episode 25): "Kimi to iu na no hikari" by Cluster'S

External links
  CLUSTER EDGE Official Website
 
 Cluster Edge on GameFAQs

2006 manga
Action anime and manga
Hakusensha manga
Marvelous Entertainment
Bandai Namco franchises
Sentai Filmworks
Shōjo manga
Sunrise (company)
TV Tokyo original programming
Anime with original screenplays